Steffen Berg Løkkebø (born 3 November 1987) is a Norwegian handball player for TV Emsdetten and the Norwegian national team.

References

1987 births
Living people
Norwegian male handball players